Üb immer Treu nach Möglichkeit is a German television series.

See also
List of German television series

External links
 

1966 German television series debuts
1966 German television series endings
German crime television series
German comedy television series
ZDF original programming
German-language television shows